Goh Tai Yong (born 24 December 1939) is a Malaysian former sports shooter. He competed in the trap event at the 1964 Summer Olympics.

References

1939 births
Living people
Malaysian male sport shooters
Olympic shooters of Malaysia
Shooters at the 1964 Summer Olympics
Place of birth missing (living people)